Rockingham Lakes Regional Park is a conservation park approximately  south of Perth, Western Australia, located within the City of Rockingham.

In Western Australia, regional parks consist of areas of land that have been identified as having outstanding conservation,
landscape and recreation values. The park contains remnants of the once widespread Swan Coastal Plain and two threatened ecological communities, Thrombolites and Sedgelands. It provides evidence of the sea level changes over the past 7,000 years.

Rockingham Lakes is one of eleven regional parks in the Perth region of Western Australia. The purpose of these regional parks is to serve as urban havens to preserve and restore cultural heritage and valuable ecosystems as well as to encourage sustainable nature-based recreation activities.

History
The concept of regional spaces in Western Australia open to the public was first proposed in 1955, when the Stephenson-Hepburn Report recommended preserving private land for future public use in what would become the Perth Metropolitan Region in 1963. The Environmental Protection Authority, EPA, identified areas of significant conservation, landscape and recreation value, in a report in 1983. In 1989, the Western Australian State Government allocated the responsibility of managing regional parks with the Department of Conservation and Land Management.

A Regional Parks Taskforce was established in 1990 but the EPA reported in 1993 that the establishment of these parks encountered difficulties. In 1997, the state government announced the establishment of the Rockingham Lakes Regional Park.

Areas

Rockingham Lakes Regional Park consists of the following major areas:

The park covers an area of 4,270 hectares and occupies approximately 16 percent of the area of the City of Rockingham. Most of the park is surrounded by commercial and residential land, only in the south does it border rural areas.

The park is non-continuous, with Cape Peron and Lake Richmond forming an isolated north-western block and Anstey and Paganoni Swamp a separate southern part. The Port Kennedy Scientific Park and Lark Hill block is separated from Lake Cooloongup, Lake Walyungup and Tamworth Hill by a major road- and rail corridor, while smaller roads still separate the other areas.

Unexploded ordnance

The Lake Cooloongup, Lake Walyungup, Port Kennedy Scientific Park and Lark Hill areas are potentially contaminated with unexploded ordnance, having been used as artillery range by the Department of Defence in the era around World War II.

References

External links
 Parks and Wildlife Service: Rockingham Lakes Regional Park
 Urban Bushland Council WA Inc.: Rockingham Lakes Regional Park
 Proposed Port Kennedy and Rockingham Parks Management Framework (1997) 

 
1997 establishments in Australia
Parks in Perth, Western Australia